Opheim Air Force Station (ADC ID: P-26, NORAD ID: Z-26) is a closed United States Air Force General Surveillance Radar station. It was closed in 1979.

History
In late 1951 Air Defense Command selected Opheim, Montana as one of twenty-eight radar stations built as part of the second segment of the permanent radar surveillance network. Prompted by the start of the Korean War, on July 11, 1950, the Secretary of the Air Force asked the Secretary of Defense for approval to expedite construction of the second segment of the permanent network. Receiving the Defense Secretary's approval on July 21, the Air Force directed the Corps of Engineers to proceed with construction.

On 1 March 1951 the 779th Aircraft Control and Warning Squadron was activated at Opheim AFS with AN/FPS-3 and AN/FPS-4 radars, and initially the station functioned as a Ground-Control Intercept (GCI) and warning station. As a GCI station, the squadron's role was to guide interceptor aircraft toward unidentified intruders picked up on the unit's radar scopes. An AN/GPS-3 radar operated between 1957 and 1961. In 1958 and 1959 AN/FPS-6 and AN/FPS-6A radars replaced the AN/FPS-4 height-finder radar. The AN/FPS-3, operational until late 1961, was replaced by an AN/FPS-7C search radar. The FPS-3 along an FPS-8 were the primary search radars. The FPS-8 was used as a backup for the FPS-7C until mid to late 1962. The spare IFF unit from the FPS-8 was salvaged and used in the FPS-7C. Also, the MIT unit from the FPS-3 was salvaged and used in the FPS-7C since its MIT was not operational until after the spring of 1964 due to design problems. SAGE utilization required both the IFF and MIT to be operational.

During 1961 Opheim AFS joined the Semi Automatic Ground Environment (SAGE) system, initially feeding data to DC-20 at Malmstrom AFB, Montana.  After joining, the squadron was re-designated as the 779th Radar Squadron (SAGE) on 15 July 1961.  The radar squadron provided information 24/7 to the SAGE Direction Center where it was analyzed to determine range, direction, altitude, speed, and whether aircraft were friendly or hostile.

In 1963 the squadron operated the AN/FPS-7C search radar along with AN/FPS-26A and AN/FPS-90 height-finder radars.
The FPS-26A heightfinder was not operational until after the spring of 1964. On 31 July 1963, the site was redesignated as NORAD ID Z-26. The AN/FPS-90 was damaged by a fire in 1966, but was repaired; it was removed sometime in the early 1970s.

In addition to the main facility, Opheim operated two AN/FPS-14 Gap Filler sites:
 Whitewater, MT    (P-26A) 
 Whitetail, MT     (P-26D) 

Over the years, the equipment at the station was upgraded or modified to improve the efficiency and accuracy of the information gathered by the radars. Opheim AFS ceased operations on 1 June 1979 as part of the inactivation of Aerospace Defense Command. The 779th Radar Squadron (SAGE) was inactivated on 29 September 1979.

Today, the former Opheim Air Force Station is abandoned and largely obliterated.  Most of the Air Force buildings have been razed, their foundations remain.  A few buildings still stand derelict.

Air Force units and assignments

Units
 Constituted as the 779th Aircraft Control and Warning Squadron
 Activated on 1 March 1951
 Redesignated as 779th Radar Squadron (SAGE) on 15 July 1961
 Redesignated as 779th Radar Squadron on 1 February 1974
 Inactivated on 29 September 1979

Assignments
 545th Aircraft Control and Warning Group, 1 March 1951
 29th Air Division, 6 February 1952
 Minot Air Defense Sector (Manual), 1 January 1961
 Great Falls Air Defense Sector, 25 June 1963
 28th Air Division, 1 April 1966
 24th Air Division, 19 November 1969 – 29 September 1979

See also
 List of United States Air Force aircraft control and warning squadrons
 United States general surveillance radar stations

References

 Cornett, Lloyd H. and Johnson, Mildred W., A Handbook of Aerospace Defense Organization  1946–1980,  Office of History, Aerospace Defense Center, Peterson AFB, CO (1980).
 Winkler, David F. & Webster, Julie L., Searching the Skies, The Legacy of the United States Cold War Defense Radar Program,  US Army Construction Engineering Research Laboratories, Champaign, IL (1997).
 Information for Opheim AFS, MT

External links

Installations of the United States Air Force in Montana
Semi-Automatic Ground Environment sites
Aerospace Defense Command military installations
Buildings and structures in Valley County, Montana
1951 establishments in Montana
1979 disestablishments in Montana
Military installations established in 1951
Military installations closed in 1979